Bargh Jadid Shiraz Football Club (Persian:  برق جدید فارس ) an Iranian football club based in Shiraz, Iran. They currently compete in the Azadegan League. The club is different than the original Bargh Shiraz which competes in League 3.

New Bargh Fars Football Club is part of New Bargh Fars Sports Club who also field a Handball, Volleyball and Basketball teams.

History
New Bargh was founded in 2015 by Bargh Shiraz fans and started competing in League 2. On 29 September 2016 New Bargh beat local rivals Fajr Sepasi 1–0 in the Round of 64 in the 2016–17 Hazfi Cup.

On 23 May 2017, New Bargh were promoted to the second tiered Azadegan League after beating Shahin Bushehr in a play-off.

Kit
The team is sponsored by Italian sportswear company Givova.

References

Football clubs in Iran
Organizations established in 2015